The Presbyterian Church of England was a late-19th century and 20th century Presbyterian denomination in England. The church's origins lay in the 1876 merger of the English congregations of the chiefly Scottish United Presbyterian Church with various other Presbyterian congregations in England. In 1972, the Presbyterian Church of England merged with the Congregational Church in England and Wales to become the United Reformed Church.

References

Presbyterianism in England
Religious organizations established in 1876
Religious organizations disestablished in 1972